Poynor may refer to:

Places
Poynor, Texas, a town in Henderson County, Texas, United States
Poynor, Missouri, an unincorporated community in Ripley County, Missouri, United States

People with the surname
Rick Poynor, British writer